Martin Rowan "Marty" Holah (born 10 September 1976 in Hamilton, New Zealand) is a New Zealand rugby union player, who has played for Welsh regional side Ospreys, the Waikato provincial team and the Chiefs Super Rugby franchise. Holah was capped in 36 international test matches for the New Zealand national team, the All Blacks. Holah's contribution to the All Black starting XV was blocked by the emergence of Richie McCaw, the former All Black captain.

The Waikato flanker first made his debut for the All Blacks on 16 June 2001 against Samoa at Albany. He is known for his ability to steal the ball in the tackle. Holah was instrumental in the NZ Māori's defeat of the British & Irish Lions during the 2005 tour at his home ground, Waikato Stadium.

In 2006, Holah was named in the unfamiliar position of blind-side flanker for the Ireland Test in Hamilton, his first start in the All Black jersey since 2004.

On 14 August 2007, it was announced that Holah had signed a two-year contract with the Celtic League champions, the Ospreys. He enjoyed his time there, later signing a one-season extension on his contract. In the 2009/10 season he was named Ospreys' Coaches Player of the Year, having been named Man of the Match against the Leicester Tigers in a must-win Heineken Cupmatch with a heroic individual defensive display, which he reproduced multiple times in helping the Ospreys to lift the Magners League title that year.

On 18 April 2011 it was announced Holah would return home to play for Waikato in the 2011 ITM Cup. Holah became a regular member of the starting side.

References

External links
 
 Ospreys Profile

1976 births
Living people
Chiefs (rugby union) players
Expatriate rugby union players in Wales
Māori All Blacks players
New Zealand expatriate rugby union players
New Zealand expatriate sportspeople in Wales
New Zealand international rugby union players
New Zealand rugby union players
Ospreys (rugby union) players
People educated at St John's College, Hamilton
Rugby union flankers
Rugby union players from Hamilton, New Zealand
Waikato rugby union players